Microlia machadoi is a species of rove beetles first found in Brazil. It is a pollen-feeder. The species differs from M. pentamera and M. tetramera by possessing a curved spine-like process in the posterior margin of its third tergum.

References

Aleocharinae
Beetles described in 2016
Beetles of South America